Olver is a surname. Those bearing it include:

 Carrie Olver (born 1967), Canadian TV personality
 Darin Olver (born 1985), Canadian ice hockey player
 Dick Olver (born 1947), British business manager
 Fergie Olver, Canadian gameshow host and sports broadcaster.
 Frank W. J. Olver (1924–2013) American mathematician
 Ian Olver (born 1953), Australian medical oncologist, cancer researcher and bio-ethicist
 Jeff Olver (born 1960), Australian footballer
 John Olver (born 1936), American politician
 John Olver (ice hockey) (born 1958), Canadian ice hockey player and coach
 John Olver (rugby union) (born 1961), English former international rugby player
 Mark Olver (born 1988), Canadian professional ice hockey player
 Peter Olver (pilot) (1917–2013), British World War II flying ace
 Peter J. Olver (born 1952), American professor of mathematics

See also
 Minor_Wheel_of_Time_characters#Olver, fictional character